The Royal Archaeological Institute (RAI) is a learned society, established in 1844, with interests in all aspects of the archaeological, architectural and landscape history of the British Isles. Membership is open to all with an interest in these areas.

Activities
One of the institute's principal activities is the publication of the Archaeological Journal, an annual peer-reviewed journal containing reports of archaeological and architectural survey and fieldwork on sites and monuments of all periods, and syntheses and overviews of similar work throughout the British Isles. It also hosts lectures and seminars, and both sponsors and participates in field trips to archaeological sites and landscapes. It works in cooperation with other archaeological bodies and societies. A programme of monthly lectures is held from October to May at Burlington House, Piccadilly, London.

Presidents
The following have served as presidents of the institute:

See also
 Society of Antiquaries of London
 Royal Anthropological Institute of Great Britain and Ireland

References

External links
 

Organizations established in 1844
Archaeological organizations
1844 establishments in the United Kingdom
Archaeology of the United Kingdom
Organisations based in the United Kingdom with royal patronage